This is a list of Spanish football transfers for the summer sale prior to the 2020–21 season of La Liga. Only moves from La Liga are listed.

Due to the COVID-19 pandemic and its effects on sports leagues worldwide, FIFA announced that the summer transfer window opening date will remain the same under certain conditions regarding original squad involvement. However, local football federations were allowed to modify the window to their convenience. On 8 June 2020, the RFEF and La Liga agreed to start the window on 4 August and end on 5 October due to the 2019–20 La Liga season concluding on 19 July after hiatus.

Although a few transfers were announced prior to the starting date, the transferred players will not officially become part of their new club until the window's opening. New signings that were originally included in rosters for the post-hiatus 2019–20 UEFA Champions league and Europa League knockout phases went on to play the competition with their former club by contract, they were ready for use at their new club once the tournaments concluded. All loan spells ending on 30 June 2020 were extended until the rescheduled end of their clubs' respective 2019–20 season.

Players without a club can join one at any time, either during or in between transfer windows. Clubs below La Liga level can also sign players on loan at any time. If needed, clubs can sign a goalkeeper on an emergency loan, if all others are unavailable.

Alavés 
Manager:  Pablo Machín (1st season)

In

Out

Athletic Bilbao 
Manager:  Gaizka Garitano (3rd season)

In

Out

Atlético Madrid 
Manager:  Diego Simeone (10th season)

In

Out

Barcelona 
Manager:  Ronald Koeman (1st season)

In

Out

Cádiz 
Manager:  Álvaro Cervera (6th season)

In

Out

Celta Vigo 
Manager:  Óscar García (2nd season)

In

Out

Eibar 
Manager:  José Luis Mendilibar (6th season)

In

Out

Elche 
Manager:  Jorge Almirón (1st season)

In

Out

Getafe 
Manager:  José Bordalás (5th season)

In

Out

Granada 
Manager:  Diego Martínez (3rd season)

In

Out

Huesca 
Manager:  Míchel (2nd season)

In

Out

Levante 
Manager:  Paco López (4th season)

In

Out

Osasuna 
Manager:  Jagoba Arrasate (3rd season)

In

Out

Real Betis 
Manager:  Manuel Pellegrini (1st season)

In

Out

Real Madrid 
Manager:  Zinedine Zidane (3rd season)

In

Out

Real Sociedad 
Manager:  Imanol Alguacil (3rd season)

In

Out

Sevilla 
Manager:  Julen Lopetegui (2nd season)

In

Out

Valencia 
Manager:  Javi Gracia (1st season)

In

Out

Valladolid 
Manager:  Sergio González (4th season)

In

Out

Villarreal 
Manager:  Unai Emery (1st season)

In

Out

References

Transfers
Spain
2020